Lars Herrmann (born 12 April 1977) is a German police officer and politician for the Alternative for Germany (AfD) and since 2017 member of the Bundestag, the federal legislative body. He is a member of the völkisch-nationalistic Flügel of his party.

Life and politics
Hermann was born 1977 in the East German town of Leisnig and became a police officer at the Federal Police (Bundespolizei).

Hermann entered the newly founded AfD in March 2013. He was said to be a fan of Frauke Petry, till she stepped out of the party.

He became a member of the bundestag after the 2017 German federal election.

In 2019 Herrmann and some other AfD politicians signed a letter, in which the leader of Flüggel Björn Höcke got asked to concentrate on his legitimated position as chairman of AfD Thuringia and not to split the whole party nationwide.

References 

1977 births
People from Leisnig
Members of the Bundestag for Saxony
Living people
Members of the Bundestag 2017–2021
Members of the Bundestag for the Alternative for Germany
Politicians from Saxony
German police officers